Remixed is a Japan-only compilation featuring American artist Alicia Keys. It was released to coincide with her appearance at the 2008 Summersonic festival. It peaked on the Oricon Weekly Album Chart at number 117 and spent five weeks on it. The album includes remixes from the Black Eyed Peas, Kanye West, Salaam Remi Jony Rockstar, Seiji and Wideboys.

Track listing

Charts

References

External links 
 Remixed at Discogs

2008 remix albums
Alicia Keys remix albums
J Records remix albums